The Słuck Confederation was a confederation formed in Slutsk on March 20, 1767 by the Protestant (Calvinist) szlachta of the Great Duchy of Lithuania. Its marshal was Paweł Grabowski. Supported by the Russian army, it contributed to the destabilization of the Polish–Lithuanian Commonwealth, formation of the Radom Confederation and to the collapse of the reforms of the Convocation Sejm (1764).

See also
 Repnin Sejm

1767 establishments in the Polish–Lithuanian Commonwealth
Polish confederations
18th century in Belarus
Poland–Russia relations
Slutsk